Hajj Abdal (also Romanized as Ḩājj ‘Abdāl; also known as Ḩājjī ‘Abdāl) is a village in Meydan Chay Rural District, in the Central District of Tabriz County, East Azerbaijan Province, Iran. At the 2006 census, its population was 754, in 201 families.

References 

Populated places in Tabriz County